Group A of the 1997 Fed Cup Americas Zone Group I was one of two pools in the Americas Zone Group I of the 1997 Fed Cup. Five teams competed in a round robin competition, with the top two teams advancing to the knockout stage, and the bottom team being relegated down to 1998 Group II.

Canada vs. Ecuador

Brazil vs. Mexico

Canada vs. Brazil

Ecuador vs. Mexico

Canada vs. Mexico

Brazil vs. Ecuador

  placed last in the pool, and thus was relegated to Group II in 1998, where they placed first in their pool of eight and as such advanced back to Group I for 1998.

See also
Fed Cup structure

References

External links
 Fed Cup website

1997 Fed Cup Americas Zone